Dig (formerly Dig Inn) is an American chain of locally farm sourced restaurants that was founded by Adam Eskin. In 2011, the first Dig restaurant was opened in New York City. As of January 2019, the chain has 26 restaurants in New York City, Rye Brook, and Boston. The company opened its first Philadelphia location in 2019.

History 
The company received $21.5 million in early funding rounds, followed by $30 million in Series D funding. The main contributors to this funding include Monogram Capital Partners, and Bill Allen (former CEO of OSI Restaurant Partners).

In January 2019, the company introduced a new delivery concept called Room Service available in limited release in downtown Manhattan.

In April 2019, the company announced a new $20 million round of financing receiving $15 million from Danny Meyer investment group Enlightened Hospitality Investments.

As of April 2019, the company also plans to open its first full-service, sit-down restaurant concept in New York's West Village.

Reception 
Dig was named the best fast casual restaurant of 2017 by Boston magazine.

See also 
 New American cuisine

References

External links 
 

Fast casual restaurants
Restaurants in Boston
Restaurants in New York City
Restaurants established in 2011
2011 establishments in New York City